The Washington Capitals are a professional ice hockey team based in Washington, D.C.The team is a member of the Metropolitan Division of the Eastern Conference of the National Hockey League (NHL). The Capitals played at the Capital Centre from their inaugural season in 1974 to 1997, when they moved to the MCI Center, now known as the Capital One Arena. The franchise has had six general managers since their inception.

Key

General managers

See also
List of NHL general managers

Notes
 A running total of the number of general managers of the franchise. Thus any general manager who has two or more separate terms as general manager is only counted once.

References

Washington Capitals
General managers
Washington Capitals general managers
general managers